Fotbal Club Ozana Târgu Neamț, commonly known as FC Ozana Târgu Neamț, or simply as Ozana Târgu Neamț, is a Romanian football club based in Târgu Neamț, Neamț County and currently is playing in the Liga III.

History
Ozana Târgu Neamț was founded in 1974 and began competing in the Neamț County Championship. 
After only one year was promoted in Divizia C winning the county championship and promotion play-off against champion of Vaslui County, Avântul Huși ( 2–0 at Huși and 2–1 at Târgu Neamț). The squad of Ozana in the first season was composed of:  Floș, Constantinescu — goalkeepers; Croitoru II, Pasat, Axinte, Fodor, Gavriluță — defenders; Meterciuc, Croitoru I, Dascălu, Roman, Dumitraș — midfielders; Ionașcu, Anegroaie, Tulbure, Doru Apetrei, Hritcu — strikers; Mircea Crețu (head coach).

At the end of the season, the newly promoted team would finish in 12th place. In the 1976/1977 season the name of the team would change, and Ozana Târgu Neamț would turn into Cetatea Târgu Neamț. After 18 seasons played in the third stage of the Romanian Championship, Cetatea Târgu Neamț promoted in Divizia B. The season 1994/1995 was to be the brightest year for the team, occupying the fourth place in Divizia B, coming from the position of newly promoted.

Two years later, things were changing, and valuable players starting to leave, seeing the team being relegated to Divizia C. A year later, in 1997, Cetatea Târgu Neamț would be disbanded and Târgu Neamț would be left without the football team.
 
After a 9-year break Cetatea Târgu Neamț is re-established. From the first season it finished first in Liga IV – Neamț County, with only two defeats that season. After 10 years of waiting, "the white-and-blue men" would return to the third league. In 2016, the club is disbanded for the second time.

In 2018, the club was reestablished under the name of FC Ozana Târgu Neamț by Andrei Isache, Laurențiu Pavel and Cosmin Bocaneț (founding members).

After only one season the team won Liga IV – Neamț County and they promoted to Liga III after a play-off match against Viitorul Liteni, Suceava County.

Chronology of names

Honours
Liga III:
Winners (1): 1993–94
Liga IV – Neamț County
Winners (5): 1974–75, 1998–99, 2006–07, 2012–13, 2018–19
Runners-up (1): 1997–98

Players

First team squad

Club officials

Board of directors

Current technical staff

League history

References

External links

Association football clubs established in 1974
Football clubs in Neamț County
Liga II clubs
Liga III clubs
Liga IV clubs
1974 establishments in Romania